Will is a historical fiction novel by Christopher Rush, published in 2007. It is told from the perspective of William Shakespeare as he writes his will. The book's film right were sold to Ben Kingsley's SBK pictures in 2007.

References

2007 British novels
English novels
Novels about William Shakespeare